Intrepid Journeys is a New Zealand television series, which screens on TV ONE in New Zealand and on Vibrant TV Network in the United States. Making its debut in 2003, the show focuses on New Zealand celebrities who travel to exotic countries to see that country's history, culture and people.

It is a multi-award-winning travel series. It is not a “Survivor” style manufactured “challenge” show.  It is about meeting real challenges in the real world, travelling to lesser-known places and then getting around the way locals do… by foot, bus and camel.

Across each hour-long episode, Intrepid Journeys follows a celebrity traveller for two weeks in a rough and ready destination. The appeal of the show is two-fold.  Aside from seeing a personality rise to a challenge, there is also the chance to gather knowledge and understanding of places, lives, events and happenings foreign to Western culture.

Although they are celebrity travellers, they travel and live as the locals do  - ride bumpy local buses with chickens and goats, stay in  villages and eat traditional food which stretches the palate.

Destinations include Libya, Borneo, Iran, Uganda, Myanmar, Tibet, Madagascar, Nicaragua, Bolivia, Cuba, Vietnam, Ecuador and Mali.

Series one (2003)

Series two (2004)

Series three (2005)

Series four (2006)

Series five (2007)

Series six (2008)

Series seven (2009)

Series eight (2011)

Series nine (2012)

External links

 Official website
Series 1 (2003) on IMDb database
Series 2 (2004) on IMDb database
Series 3 (2005) on IMDb database

New Zealand reality television series
Television shows funded by NZ on Air
TVNZ 1 original programming